

This is a list of the National Register of Historic Places listings in Hillsborough County, Florida.

This is intended to be a complete list of the properties and districts on the National Register of Historic Places in Hillsborough County, Florida. The locations of National Register properties and districts for which the latitude and longitude coordinates are included below, may be seen in a map.

There are 100 properties and districts listed on the National Register in the county, including 3 National Historic Landmarks, all three of which are in Tampa. 22 of these properties and districts are listed here, while the others are listed separately in National Register of Historic Places listings in Tampa, Florida.

Current listings

|}

See also
 List of National Historic Landmarks in Florida
 National Register of Historic Places listings in Florida
 National Register of Historic Places listings in Tampa, Florida
 List of Mediterranean Revival Style Buildings of Davis Islands

References

 
Hillsborough County